Lephana is a genus of moths of the family Erebidae. The genus was previously classified in the subfamily Calpinae of the family Noctuidae.

Species
Lephana excisata Kaye, 1924
Lephana metacrocea Hampson, 1926
Lephana oedisema Hampson, 1926
Lephana tetraphorella Walker, 1866 – Type species

References
Natural History Museum Lepidoptera genus database

Anobinae
Moth genera